Todorka Bakardzhieva (1850-1934) was a Bulgarian actress and a known revolutionary.  She was an actor in the company of Dobri Voynikov. She was a member of the Bulgarian Revolutionary Central Committee and active in its service during the Russo-Turkish War (1877–1878).

References

1934 deaths
1850 births
19th-century Bulgarian women
Bulgarian stage actresses
19th-century actresses